Andrew Bradford "Brad" Rowland (born July 14, 1928) is a former football player. He was twice an All-American at McMurry University. Rowland played one season with the Chicago Bears.  He was inducted into the College Football Hall of Fame in 2008.

References

1928 births
Living people
American football running backs
Chicago Bears players
College Football Hall of Fame inductees
McMurry University alumni
People from Hamlin, Texas